Trevon Garraway (born 11 January 1984) is a Guyanese cricketer. He played in one List A and twelve first-class matches for Guyana from 2005 to 2009.

See also
 List of Guyanese representative cricketers

References

External links
 

1984 births
Living people
Guyanese cricketers
Guyana cricketers